Symposium is a novel by Scottish author Muriel Spark, published in 1990. It was regarded by John Mortimer writing in The Sunday Times as one of the best novels of that year.

Plot introduction
It is the story of a dinner party and the events leading up to it involving the lives of the five couples attending:
 Hurley Reed (an American painter) and Chris Donovan (a rich Australian widow), the party hosts
 Lord and Lady Suzy, who have recently been burgled
 Ernst and Ella Untzinger, an EU commissioner and his wife, a teacher
 Margaret and William Damien, newlyweds just returned from a honeymoon in Venice
 Annabel Treece and Roland Sykes, a TV producer and genealogist, cousins
The story includes many flashbacks into the lives of the guests including a convent of Marxist nuns, a burglary ring preying on the guests, a mad Scottish uncle and several unexplained deaths. The dinner party itself ends with the murder of the mother of one of the guests.

Reception
Symposium was applauded by Time Magazine for the "sinister elegance" of Muriel Spark's "medium of light but lethal comedy."
'Symposium is put together like an intricate jigsaw...It is extremely clever and highly entertaining' - Penelope Lively
'Stiletto-sharp fiction...it is the dialogue that propels this dangerous, devilish book' - Scotland on Sunday

References

External links
review from EW.com
Spark's Symposium: a postmodernist critique

1990 British novels
Novels by Muriel Spark
Novels set in London
Constable & Co. books
Houghton Mifflin books